Hyposmocoma neckerensis is a species of moth of the family Cosmopterigidae. It was first described by Otto Swezey in 1926. It is endemic to Necker Island and Gardner Island in the western Pacific.

External links

neckerensis
Endemic moths of Hawaii